The Barghawatas (also Barghwata or Berghouata) were a Berber tribal confederation on the Atlantic coast of Morocco, belonging to the Masmuda confederacy. After allying with the Sufri Kharijite rebellion in Morocco against the Umayyad Caliphate, they established an independent state (AD744-1058) in the area of Tamesna on the Atlantic coast between Safi and Salé under the leadership of Tarif al-Matghari.

Etymology
Some historians believe that the term Barghawata is a phonetic deformation of the term Barbati, a nickname which Tarif carried. It is thought that he was born in the area of Barbate, near Cádiz in Spain. However, Jérôme Carcopino and other historians think the name is much older and the tribe is the same as that which the Romans called Baquates, who up until the 7th century lived near Volubilis.

History

Few details are known about Barghawata. Most of the historical sources are largely posterior to their rule and often present a contradictory and confused historical context. However, one tradition appears more interesting. It comes from Córdoba in Spain and its author is the Large Prior of Barghawata and the Barghawata ambassador to Córdoba Abu Salih Zammur, around the middle of the 10th century. This tradition is regarded as most detailed concerning Barghwata. It was reported by Al Bakri, Ibn Hazm and Ibn Khaldun, although their interpretations comprise some divergent points of view.

The Barghawatas, along with the Ghomara and the Miknasa, launched the Berber Revolt of 739 or 740. They were fired up by Sufri Kharijite preachers, a Muslim sect that embraced a doctrine representing total egalitarianism in opposition to the aristocracy of the Quraysh which had grown more pronounced under the Umayyad Caliphate. The rebels elected Maysara al-Matghari to lead their revolt, and successfully seized control of nearly all of what is now Morocco, inspiring further rebellions in the Maghreb and al-Andalus. At the Battle of Bagdoura, the rebels annihilated a particularly strong army dispatched by the Umayyad caliph from Syria. But the rebels army itself was eventually defeated in the outskirts Kairouan, Ifriqiya in 741. In the aftermath, the rebel alliance dissolved. Even before this denouement, the Barghawatas, as founders of the revolt, had grown resentful of the attempt by later adherents, notably the Zenata chieftains, in alliance with the increasingly authoritarian Sufri commissars, to take control of the leadership of the rebellion. As their primary objective – the liberation of their people from Umayyad rule – had already been achieved, and there was little prospect of it ever being re-imposed, the Barghwata saw little point in continued military campaigns. In 742 or 743, the Barghwata removed themselves from the rebel alliance, and retreated to the Tamesna region, on the Atlantic coast of Morocco, where they founded their new independent state and abandoned their Sufri Kharijitism.

The Barghawatas ruled in the Tamesna region for more than three centuries (744–1058). Under the successors of Salih ibn Tarif, Ilyas ibn Salih (792-842); Yunus (842-888) and Abu Ghufail (888–913) the tribal kingdom was consolidated, and missions sent to neighbouring tribes. After initially good relations with the Umayyad Caliphate of Cordoba there was a break at the end of the 10th century. Two Umayyad incursions, as well as attacks by the Fatimids were fought off by the Barghawata. From the 11th century there was an intensive guerrilla war with the Banu Ifran. Even though the Barghawata were subsequently much weakened, they were still able to fend off Almoravid attacks—the spiritual leader of the Almoravids, Abdallah ibn Yasin, fell in battle against them on 7 July 1058. Only in 1149 were the Barghawata eliminated by the Almohads as a political and religious group.

Religion
After the conversion to Islam at the beginning of the 8th century and the Maysara uprising (739-742), the Barghawata Berbers formed their own state on the Atlantic coast between Safi and Salé.

The Barghawata kingdom followed a syncretic religion inspired by Islam with elements of Sunni, Shi'a and Kharijite Islam, mixed with astrological and traditional Berber mythology such as their taboo surrounding eating eggs and chickens, and the belief that the saliva of Salih and his family contained baraka, or, roughly translated, blessedness. Supposedly, they had their own Qur'an in the Berber language comprising 80 suras under the leadership of the second ruler of the dynasty Salih ibn Tarif who had taken part in the Maysara uprising. He proclaimed himself a prophet. He also claimed to be the final Mahdi, and that Isa (Jesus) would be his companion and pray behind him.

Tribes 
The Barghawata confederacy was made of 29 tribes. 12 of these tribes adopted the Barghawata religion while 17 retained Islam.

Barghawata religion (syncretic with Islam) tribes

 Gerawa
 Zouagha
 Branès
 Banu Abi Nacer
 Menjasa
 Banu Abi Nuh
 Banu Waghmar
 Matghara
 Banu Borgh
 Banu Derr
 Matmata
 Banu Zaksent

Khariji Muslim tribes

 Zenata-Jbal
 Banu Bellit
 Nemala
 Ounsent
 Banu Ifren
 Banu Naghit
 Banu Nuaman
 Banu Fallusa
 Banu Kuna
 Banu Sebker
 Assada
 Regana
 Azmin
 Manada
 Masina
 Resana
 Trara

Some constituent tribes, such as Branès, Matmata, Ifren and Trara, were fractions of much larger tribal groups, and only the Tamesna-based fractions joined the Barghawata Confederacy.

Barghawata kings
Tarif al-Matghari
Ṣāliḥ ibn Tarīf (744-?), who declared himself prophet in 744 and went away at the age of 47, promising to return.
Ilyas ibn Salih (?792-842), who is said to have professed Islām publicly but Ṣāliḥ's religion secretly, and died in the 50th year of his reign.
Yunus ibn Ilyas (?842-888), who made Ṣāliḥ's religion official and fought those who would not convert (killing 7770 people, according to Ibn Khaldun's sources, some at a place called Tamlukeft). Curiously enough, he is also said to have performed the Hajj. He died in the 44th year of his reign.
Abu-Ghufayl Muhammad (?888-917), who may also have been called a prophet (according to a poem Ibn-Khaldun cites) and who had 44 wives and more sons. He died in the 29th year of his reign.
Abu al-Ansar Abdullah (?917-961), buried at Ameslakht. He died in the 44th year of his reign.
Abu Mansur Isa (?961-?), who was 22 when he became king.

See also
 Kingdom of Nekor
 Maghrawa
 Banu Ifran

References

Citations

Bibliography
 Ulrich Haarmann, Geschichte der Arabischen Welt. C.H. Beck München, 2001.
 John Iskander, Devout Heretics: The Barghawata in Maghribi Historiography, in The Journal of North African Studies Volume 12, 2007, pages 37–53.
 Stephan und Nandy Ronart, Lexikon der Arabischen Welt. Artemis Verlag, 1972.
 Mohammed Talbi, Hérésie, acculturation et nationalisme des berbères Bargawata, in Premier congrès des cultures Méditerranéennes d'influence arabo-berbère, Alger 1973,217-233.

744 establishments
1058 disestablishments
Berber dynasties
Berber peoples and tribes
740s in the Umayyad Caliphate
Masmuda
Medieval Morocco
States and territories established in the 740s
8th-century establishments in Africa
Kharijites